William Michael Kellagher (August 13, 1920 – May 11, 2003) was an American football fullback who played for the Chicago Rockets of the All-America Football Conference (AAFC).

Kellagher played for the Rockets from 1946 to 1948. In 1947, along with Tommy Colella and Len Eshmont, Kellagher co-led the AAFC with 6 interceptions. Also in 1947, Kellagher ended Cleveland Browns quarterback Otto Graham's streak of 91 consecutive pass attempts without an interception, a professional football record at the time.

Kellagher died on May 11, 2003 in Philadelphia.

References

1920 births
2003 deaths
American football fullbacks
Chicago Rockets players
Fordham Rams football players
Players of American football from Pennsylvania